Holcomb is a surname, originating in a number of English villages with the name Holcombe. Early examples are recorded as de Holcombe, and the final e has been dropped from many family names, particularly in the USA. Notable people with the surname Holcomb include:

 Al Holcomb, American football coach
 Amasa Holcomb, American farmer, surveyor, civil engineer, businessman, and manufacturer of surveying instruments
 Benjamin Harrison Holcomb, American, one-time oldest living man
 Bob Holcomb, American politician and attorney
 Bobby Holcomb, American artist and musician
 Charles Holcomb, American judge
 Charlie Holcomb, American-born English cricketer
 Cole Holcomb, American football player
 Corey Holcomb, American stand-up comedian, radio host, and actor
 David Holcomb, American State Senator from Ohio
 Doug Holcomb, basketball player
 Drew Holcomb, American singer and songwriter
 Eric Holcomb, American politician, Governor of Indiana 
 John Noble Holcomb, American soldier
 Kelly Holcomb, American football player
 Marcus H. Holcomb, American politician and Governor of Connecticut
 Mark Holcomb, American guitarist and songwriter, Periphery 
 Mike Holcomb, American Christian singer
 Noah Holcomb, American mountain biker
 Randy Holcomb, American basketball player
 Richard Holcomb, commercial sex worker specialist, street outreach worker and HIV prevention counselor
 Robin Holcomb, singer, songwriter and pianist
 Rod Holcomb, American television director and producer
 Roscoe Holcomb, American musician
 Sarah Holcomb, American actress
 Silas A. Holcomb, American lawyer and politician
 Steven Holcomb (1980–2017), American bobsled driver
 Stu Holcomb, American college football coach
 Thomas Holcomb, Commandant of the US Marine Corps
 William F. Holcomb, founder of Holcomb Valley, California

See also
Holcombe (surname)

English toponymic surnames
English-language surnames